Suresh Peiris (born 2 October 1990) is a Sri Lankan cricketer. He made his List A debut for Polonnaruwa District in the 2016–17 Districts One Day Tournament on 21 March 2017. He made his Twenty20 debut for Panadura Sports Club in the 2017–18 SLC Twenty20 Tournament on 24 February 2018.

References

External links
 

1990 births
Living people
Sri Lankan cricketers
Kalutara Town Club cricketers
Panadura Sports Club cricketers
Polonnaruwa District cricketers